This is a list of the Hewlett-Packard 400 series computer models in Sweden. In March–July 2002 Hewlett Packard were producing a new low budget desktop PC series for home users, which came along with the 700 series

The 400 series were launched in December 2002 for public use in the United States and several European countries.

Desktop PCs

Hewlett-Packard 400
All were running v.90 modems

See also
List of HP Pavilion 700 series in Sweden

References

Pavilion 400